Flemming Hansen may refer to:

Flemming Hansen (politician) (1939–2021), Danish politician
Flemming Hansen (handballer) (1948–2013), Danish Olympic handball player
, Danish international handball player
Flemming Hansen (cyclist) (born 1944), Danish cyclist